Daniel Robert Jansen (born April 15, 1995) is an American professional baseball catcher for the Toronto Blue Jays of Major League Baseball (MLB).

Professional career

Minor leagues
Jansen attended Appleton West High School in Appleton, Wisconsin, and was drafted by the Blue Jays in the 16th round of the 2013 Major League Baseball draft. He had committed to play college baseball at Jacksonville University, but signed with the Blue Jays instead. He was assigned to the Rookie-level Gulf Coast League Blue Jays for the season, appearing in 36 games and hitting .246 with 18 runs batted in (RBI). He showed above-average plate discipline that season, walking 21 times while striking out only 10 times. In 2014, Jansen was promoted to the Rookie Advanced Bluefield Blue Jays. In 38 games, he batted .282 with five home runs and 17 RBI. Jansen was assigned to the Class-A Lansing Lugnuts in 2015, but spent more than half the season on the disabled list. After a seven-game rehab stint in the Gulf Coast League, Jansen rejoined the Lugnuts in August. In 53 total games, he hit .210 with five home runs and 30 RBI.

Jansen was invited to Major League spring training on January 12, 2016, and reassigned to minor league camp on March 12. He was assigned to the Advanced-A Dunedin Blue Jays for the 2016 minor league season. In 57 total games, Jansen hit .218 with one home run and 25 RBI in 2016. After the 2016 season, the Blue Jays assigned Jansen to the Mesa Solar Sox of the Arizona Fall League. He appeared in 20 games for the Sox and hit .282 with 11 RBI and the first two triples of his professional career.

Prior to the start of the 2017 season, Jansen found he was having vision problems, and began wearing glasses on and off the field. The glasses paid immediate dividends, as Jansen hit .369 with five home runs and 18 RBI in 31 games for Dunedin before being promoted to the Double-A New Hampshire Fisher Cats. He played in 52 games for New Hampshire and hit .291 before being promoted to the Triple-A Buffalo Bisons in August. With Buffalo, Jansen hit .328 with three home runs and 10 RBI in 21 games. On November 20, 2017, Jansen was added to Toronto's 40-man roster. Heading into the 2018 season, Jansen was named the eighth-best catching prospect by MLB. He played in the All-Star Futures Game in July, during which he hit a home run.

Toronto Blue Jays
The Blue Jays promoted Jansen to the major leagues on August 12, 2018. He made his debut the following night, recording two singles in a 3–1 loss to the Kansas City Royals. He and Sean Reid-Foley became the first batterymates to debut in the same American League game since Billy Rohr and Russ Gibson did so in April 1967. Jansen hit his first major league home run on August 14 off Royals pitcher Heath Fillmyer, breaking a 3–3 tie in a game the Blue Jays would end up winning 6–5. He finished the season hitting .247 in 31 games.

Overall with the 2020 Blue Jays, Jansen batted .182 with six home runs and 20 RBIs in 43 games. During Game 2 of the AL Wild Card Series against the Tampa Bay Rays, Jansen became the second Blue Jays player in franchise history with a multi-home run game in the post-season.

The 2021 season saw Jansen playing 70 games, splitting playing time with catcher Reese McGuire. Jansen spent time on the injured list in July and August with a right hamstring strain, but returned to the lineup to play the last 21 games of the season with a .322 batting average and 7 home runs.

Jansen's 2022 season began strong before a left oblique injury in April sidelined him for over a month. On June 6, Jansen was again placed on the IL after suffering a fracture in his left pinky finger after being hit by a 96mph pitch during a game against the Kansas City Royals.

On July 22, 2022, the Blue Jays set a franchise record for runs scored in a game with a 28-5 win over the Boston Red Sox at Fenway Park. Jansen hit 2 home runs over the Green Monster in left field, scored 4 times, and contributed 6 RBIs.

On January 13, 2023, Jansen signed a one-year, $3.5 million contract with the Blue Jays, avoiding salary arbitration.

Personal life
Jansen is the younger son of parents Steve and Kathy. His older brother is Matthew. In his youth, Jansen's family hosted players for the then-Seattle Mariners Class-A affiliate Wisconsin Timber Rattlers. In 2004, Adam Jones was housed by the Jansen family.

Jansen and his wife Alexis were married in March 2022 with former teammate Rowdy Tellez as the officiant.

References

External links

1995 births
American expatriate baseball players in Canada
Baseball players from Illinois
Bluefield Blue Jays players
Buffalo Bisons (minor league) players
Dunedin Blue Jays players
Gulf Coast Blue Jays players
Lansing Lugnuts players
Living people
Major League Baseball catchers
Mesa Solar Sox players
New Hampshire Fisher Cats players
People from Elmhurst, Illinois
Toronto Blue Jays players